Orgoglio is a literary character in Edmund Spenser's famous epic The Faerie Queene.  He appears in the seventh canto of Book One as a beast and attacks the main character, Redcrosse, who symbolizes the ultimate Christian knight, during a moment of weakness. 
"Orgoglio" means "pride" in Italian.
In chapter IX of Waverley, by Sir Walter Scott, the manor of Bradwardyne is compared to the castle of Orgoglio.

References

 
 
  SparkNotes
  Wiktionary

Further reading
 
 
 

The Faerie Queene
Characters in epic poems
English giants